Byfield National Park is a national park in the Shire of Livingstone, Queensland, Australia.

Geography 

The park is 70 km north-east of Rockhampton.  The parks encloses 12 km of coastline including four beaches.

To the north of the national park is Shoalwater Bay and Byfield State Forest is located to the west of Byfield National Park.

The park contains a number of four-wheel drive tracks and camping areas.

The average elevation of the terrain in the park is 48 meters.

Climate 
The park demarcates the southern boundary of a tropical savannah climate (Köppen: Aw), although the subtropics are almost a degree to the south.

Flora and fauna
The park is home to Pandanus tectorius, a plant useful against coastal erosion and provides important habitat for many insects and animals. Rangers are fighting a destructive pest known as the pandanus planthopper in the park, using various means including the use of a native wasp called Aphanomerus pusillus.

Waterpark Creek, a creek which flows through the park, contains a population of Rhadinocentrus ornatus, a small freshwater fish species.

See also

 Protected areas of Queensland

References

External links 

National parks of Central Queensland
Protected areas established in 1988
Shire of Livingstone